is a Japanese professional drifting driver, currently competing in the D1 Grand Prix series and Formula Drift Japan for TMAR. Formerly competing in Formula DRIFT USA and World Championship series for Achilles Radial. He was the first driver to win the two drifting majors, D1GP in 2008 and Formula D in 2012.

Biography
From an early age, Siato gained an appreciation for motorbikes, and motorbike racing, a hobby and sport his Father had exposed him to. Saito then gained his motorcycle license at the age of 16. One evening, when Saito was going for a ride on his motorbike with his friends, he stumbled upon a drift car meeting in the hills of Karuizawa. There he saw a white Mercedes-Benz saloon drifting. From then on he wanted to take part in drifting, and drift a saloon-style car. Upon turning 18, he gained his drivers license, though his father did not want him to take part in drifting. His Father bought him a Mini Cooper as his first car, a vehicle that is generally not capable of performing the high-speed maneuvers required for drifting. Saito attempted to drift the vehicle anyways and ended up getting it written off in an accident. He then bought a Nissan Silvia S13 without asking for permission from his parents. Saito immediately began practicing. His first practice session lasted 36 straight hours, with Saito only stopping for food and fuel. Saito began to develop his skills in the vehicle, but crashed it only a few weeks later.
In 2005, Saito won the title for privateers.

Saito started competing in the D1 Grand Prix in the third round of the 2004 season in his Toyota Mark II JZX90. Following his crash with Kawabata in Fuji 2007 he replaced the JZX90 with JZX100 Mark II. The following year he kept improving at a steady pace and won the championship for the first time. At around this time Daigo worked at his parents' Pre-school as the driver.

In 2011 he became D1GP first ever solo run champion. The following year due to his participation in Formula Drift in USA he missed several D1GP rounds, but he was still a contender for the championship until the last round where he lost the title to Nobushige Kumakubo.

In 2013 his participation is the same like the previous year, he started his own shop called Fat Five Racing but before the final round of the season his garage where he kept his car burned down and force him to borrow his staff car for the final round.

In 2014 he used Lexus IS for D1GP as he built a JZX100 Mark II and Chaser at a garage in his own house replacing the one that caught fire in 2013. In Ebisu he finally debut the Mark II.

In 2015, he worked on the first Drift specification Lamborghini Murcielago. He also started to be sponsored by Monster Energy.

In 2016 Saito now with Wanli as tire supplier. The combination worked very well as Daigo won the first two opening rounds of the season beating the defending champion Masato Kawabata on both occasions. However due to how his Mark II was built, the car is banned forcing him to switch to more docile JZX100 Chaser, however, this didn't slow him down as he win 3 more rounds and sealed the championship with a round to spare; his 5 wins in a single season is a record that only Masanori Kohashi has been able to equal in 2021.

In 2017 for the first time he would be driving a non-Japanese car in form of a Corvette C6 GT3 powered with a LS engine. in only its third outing he managed to get the car to the final and grab a win later in Ebisu in what would be his only win with the Corvette.

In 2018 he won the rear-wheel drive class at the Gymkhana Grid. He also compete in Russian Drift Series with his JZX100 Mark II and finished the season as runner-up due to his participation in Russia he's unable to compete full season in D1GP

Since 2019, he drives Toyota GR Supra in D1GP. He planned to enter Eurofighter BMW E92 but he was contacted by Toyota to use the newly released GR Supra and grabbed his first win with the chassis in 2021 in the third GR Supra he make.

In 2022 he alongside his teammate Hokuto Matsuyama compete in Formula Drift Japan with an identical GR86 and change tire supplier to Yokohama.

Formula Drift (USA)
In 2012, Saito joined the Formula Drift series in the Achilles Radial Lexus SC430 powered by a Toyota 2JZ engine. He achieved his first podium finish in his first event of the series at Long Beach.  He followed this win up with a 3rd-place finish in Round 2 at Atlanta, and then a 1st-place finish at Round 3 in Palm Beach and a 4th-place finish in Round 4 at Wall Speedway. He won the championship and was rookie of the year after winning 1st place at Irwindale, in Round 7.

As part of the Achilles Radial Drift Team, his car is maintained and transported by Bridges Racing.

Saito finished in third place during his second season in Formula DRIFT USA.  He won three rounds (Atlanta, New Jersey & Irwindale) and second place at West Palm Beach.  A crash during practice at Seattle and vehicle issues in Texas effectively removed him from the chance of winning back-to-back championships.

Saito debuted a 1,200 hp Nissan GTR in April 2015 at the Formula DRIFT Streets of Long Beach event, and campaigned the car for the 2015 Formula DRIFT USA season.

Saito did not participate in Formula Drift 2016, concentrating (and winning) on D1 Grand Prix series instead. He did the same in 2017.

He planned to return to Formula Drift in 2020 and even already completed and shipped a 2JZ-powered Toyota GT86 to USA to be used in competition but due to the COVID-19 pandemic, Daigo had to abort the plan and sending back the car to Japan the following year.

Complete drifting results

D1 Grand Prix

D1 Street Legal

Formula Drift

Russian Drift Series GP

References

Sources
JDM Option
D1 Grand Prix
Formula Drift
RDS GP

External links
D1 Supporter profile
D1 Supporter profile (D1SL)
Daigo Saito official web site

Japanese racing drivers
Drifting drivers
1980 births
Living people
D1 Grand Prix drivers
Formula D drivers